The Stanford Cardinal women's soccer team represent Stanford University in the Pac-12 Conference of NCAA Division I soccer. Home games are played at Laird Q. Cagan Stadium, located on the university's campus in Palo Alto.  Paul Ratcliffe has coached the Cardinal since 2003, winning Pac-12 Coach of the Year eight times. During his tenure as head coach, the team won the 2011, 2017, and 2019 NCAA Division I Women's Soccer Tournament and nine Pac-12 titles, played in nine College Cup tournaments, and reached five NCAA Division I finals.

Five Stanford Cardinal players have been awarded the Hermann Trophy, which is awarded annually to the top college soccer player: Kelley O'Hara (2009), Christen Press (2010), Teresa Noyola (2011), Andi Sullivan (2017) and Catarina Macario (2018).

Players 

As of May 5, 2020

All-time record

School Records
As of November 17, 2019

Career Goals

Career Assists

Award winners
As of July 2020

Hermann Trophy
2009: Kelley O'Hara
2010: Christen Press
2011: Teresa Noyola
2017: Andi Sullivan
2018: Catarina Macario
2019: Catarina Macario

Pac-12 Player of the Year
1995: Carmel Murphy
1996: Erin Martin
1998: Tracye Lawyer
2002: Marcia Wallis
2009: Kelley O'Hara
2010: Christen Press
2011: Lindsay Taylor
2016: Andi Sullivan
2017: Andi Sullivan

NSCAA Player of the Year
2009: Kelley O'Hara
2010: Christen Press
2011: Teresa Noyola

Soccer America Player of the Year
1991: Julie Foudy
2009: Kelley O'Hara
2010: Christen Press
2011: Lindsay Taylor

Pac-12 Forward of the Year
2017: Catarina Macario
2018: Catarina Macario

Pac-12 Midfielder of the Year
2017: Andi Sullivan
2018: Jordan DiBiasi
2019: Catarina Macario

Pac-12 Goalkeeper of the Year
2015: Jane Campbell

Pac-12 Freshman of the Year
1999: Marcia Wallis
2000: Marcie Ward
2007: Christen Press
2008: Lindsay Taylor
2009: Mariah Nogueira
2011: Chioma Ubogagu
2014: Andi Sullivan
2015: Alana Cook
2017: Catarina Macario

Pac-12 Coach of the Year
1995: Ian Sawyers
1999: Steve Swanson
2001: Andy Nelson
2008: Paul Ratcliffe
2009: Paul Ratcliffe
2010: Paul Ratcliffe
2011: Paul Ratcliffe
2012: Paul Ratcliffe
2015: Paul Ratcliffe
2016: Paul Ratcliffe
2017: Paul Ratcliffe
2018: Paul Ratcliffe

NSCAA Coach of the Year
2008: Paul Ratcliffe
2009: Paul Ratcliffe
2011: Paul Ratcliffe

Pac-12 All-Conference First Team

1995
Kelly Adamson
Suzie Boots
Jessica Fischer
Carmel Murphy
1996
Suzie Boots
Elie Foster
Erin Martin
1997
Emily Burt
Ronnie Fair
Tracye Lawyer
1998
Ronnie Fair
Tracye Lawyer
1999
Ronnie Fair
Jen O'Sullivan
Marcia Wallis
2000
Marcie Ward
2001
Amy Sauer
Marcia Wallis
Marcie Ward
2002
Nicole Barnhart
Marcia Wallis
Marcie Ward
Callie Withers

2003
Nicole Barnhart
Ally Marquand
2004
Nicole Barnhart
Leah Tapscott
Marcie Ward
2005
Hayley Hunt
2006
Rachel Buehler
Kelley O'Hara
Shari Summers
2007
Marisa Abegg
Rachel Buehler
Kelley O'Hara
2008
Marisa Abegg
Teresa Noyola
Lindsay Taylor
2009
Mariah Nogueira
Kelley O'Hara
Christen Press
Rachel Quon
Ali Riley
2010
Christen Press
Teresa Noyola
Rachel Quon
Lindsay Taylor

2011
Alina Garciamendez
Camille Levin
Teresa Noyola
Emily Oliver
Lindsay Taylor
2012
Alina Garciamendez
Mariah Nogueira
Emily Oliver
Rachel Quon
Chioma Ubogagu
2013
Courtney Verloo
2014
Lo'eau LaBonta
Andi Sullivan
Chioma Ubogagu
2015
Jane Campbell
Haley Rosen
Andi Sullivan
2016
Maddie Bauer
Jane Campbell
Andi Sullivan
2017
Tierna Davidson
Alana Cook
Catarina Macario
Andi Sullivan

2018
Alana Cook
Jordan DiBiasi
Tegan McGrady
Catarina Macario

NSCAA First Team All-Americans

1990
Julie Foudy
1991
Julie Foudy
1992
Julie Foudy
Sarah Rafanelli
1993
Sarah Rafanelli
1994
Jessica Fischer
1995
Jessica Fischer

2002
Nicole Barnhart
Marcia Wallis
Callie Withers
2004
Nicole Barnhart
2008
Teresa Noyola
Lindsay Taylor
2009
Kelley O'Hara
2010
Teresa Noyola
Christen Press

2011
Camille Levin
Teresa Noyola
Lindsay Taylor
2012
Alina Garciamendez
Rachel Quon
2015
Andi Sullivan
2016
Maddie Bauer
Andi Sullivan
2017
Tierna Davidson
Andi Sullivan
Catarina Macario

2018
Alana Cook
Jordan DiBiasi
Catarina Macario
2019
Naomi Girma
Catarina Macario
Madison Haley
Kiki Pickett

Notable alumni 

 Julie Foudy: 274 caps with the United States women's national team, team captain from 2000–2004. Two-time World Cup Champion (1991 & 1999). Three-time Olympic Medalist (Gold in 1996 & 2004, Bronze in 2000). Inducted in the National Soccer Hall of Fame in 2007. ESPN colour commentator.
 Nicole Barnhart: 54 caps with the United States women's national team. Two-time Olympic Gold Medalist (2008 & 2012). Named to two World Cup squads. Two-time NWSL Champion (2014 & 2015) with FC Kansas City. Named NWSL Goalkeeper of the year in 2013.
 Rachel Van Hollebeke (née Rachel Buehler): Two-time Olympic Gold Medalist (2008 & 2012). Won the Silver Medal at the 2011 World Cup. NWSL Champion in 2013 with the Portland Thorns. Attended Medical school at UC San Diego School of Medicine after retiring from professional soccer.
 Kelley O'Hara: Two-time World Cup Champion (2015 & 2019). 2012 Olympic Gold medalist. Named to the FIFA FIFPro Women’s World11 in 2019.
 Christen Press: Two-time World Cup Champion (2015 & 2019), scored a goal in both tournaments. 2016 Olympian. Became the first American to win the Damallsvenskan Golden Boot in 2013.
 Ali Riley: Captain of the New Zealand national team and has earned over 100 caps with New Zealand. Played in four World Cup tournaments and three Olympic Games. Three-time Damallsvenskan Champion.
Tierna Davidson: Selected by the Chicago Red Stars with the first overall pick at the 2019 NWSL College Draft. 2019 World Cup Champion. Was the youngest player named to the United States roster for the 2019 World Cup.

References

External links 

 
1984 establishments in California
NCAA Division I women's soccer teams